Irvington is a neighborhood in the Southwest District of Baltimore, located between Yale Heights neighborhood to the west and the Gwynns Falls neighborhood to the east. It was historically nicknamed "Skulltown" for its three large cemeteries: Loudon Park, Mount Olivet and New Cathedral.

More than 50 percent of the homes in Irvington were built before 1950. Its population in 2008 was estimated at 4,548.

The community's boundary with the Gwynns Falls neighborhood is drawn by Caton Avenue and the MARC Penn Line. Its boundary with Yale Heights follows Maiden Choice Run from Frederick Avenue (north) to Loudon Park Cemetery (south). Irvington's southwest corner encompasses Loudon Park Cemetery, ending at Beechfield Avenue (west), where it meets the Beechfield neighborhood and Wilkens Avenue (south).

Founder of Irvington

On September 26, 1838, Cyrus Irving Ditty was born in West River, Anne Arundel County, Maryland. He was the youngest of two children of George Ditty of Virginia and Harriet nee Winterson. His sister was Sally. His parents lost three children in infancy, Roberta, Juliet & Georgianna. Irving's father was a descendant of Sir Jeremiah Jacob, one of Lord Baltimore's descendants. Irving preferred to be called by his middle name and used "C. Irving Ditty" legally throughout his life.

Ditty entered Dickinson College, Carlisle, PA in 1854 & graduated in 1857. In 1859, he was admitted to the Baltimore bar. In 1861, he joined Confederate Service, Company F of First Maryland Cavalry where he met Augustus Schwartze. Ditty quickly rose to Captain.

In 1869, he married Sophia Leypold Schwartze, sister of Augustus. The couple had five children, Augusta, Sophia, Roberta, Henry and George Irving (twins).

Henry Schwartze owned most of the land in Irvington. Henry died suddenly in 1855. In 1874, Ditty purchased a large amount of this land, between Frederick Avenue and Old Frederick Road, from his mother-in-law, Sophia F. Schwartze. Mr. Ditty had three dirt streets laid out, running north and south between the two turnpikes. He commissioned contractor A.S. Potter to build four houses on the avenue farthest west. He named this street Augusta, after his eldest daughter. The other two streets today are Collins and Loudon. The neighborhood, Irvington, first appeared on an 1877 map.

The Ditty family resided at 4206 Euclid Avenue in Irvington.(Known as "The Schwartze Mansion," it is listed on the Maryland National Register properties as a historical landmark.) Ditty maintained his law office in downtown Baltimore as well as another residence on West Lanvale Street in the Bolton Hill community of Baltimore. After suffering from spinal sclerosis for 6 years, Ditty died on October 3, 1887 at age 49. He is buried in Loudon Park cemetery in Irvington. 

Sophia was unable to keep up the expense and maintenanceof two properties. In 1919, the mansion was sold to the Marciano family. It was in the Marciano family until 1972 when it was sold to a physician. Sophia lived to be 86 and died in 1932. She is buried in Greenmount Cemetery. It is unknown why she was not buried with her family in Loudon Park.

Public transportation
CityLink Purple passes through Irvington as it travels between Dundalk and Catonsville. The bus serves stops on Frederick Avenue and Yale Avenue.

Quickbus Route 46 stops at Frederick Avenue and Augusta Avenue in Irvington as it travels between the Paradise Avenue loop and the Cedonia loop. It operates only on weekdays, from 5 a.m. to 6 p.m.

Schools
Mount St. Joseph College, located at 4403 Frederick Avenue in Irvington, is a Catholic high school for boys in grades 9 through 12. It was founded in 1876 by the Xavarian Brothers on the former Lusby estate.

St. Joseph Monastery School originally consisted of only Whiteford Hall.  This addition was added in 1955 due to increasing enrollment.

St. Joseph Monastery School, founded in 1889 by the Passionists Priests of St. Joseph's Monastery, was established as a parish school on the property known as Cedar Lawn.  The School Sisters of Notre Dame assumed responsibility for teaching at the school and on August 22, 1890, the first three Sisters arrived. Forty students were enrolled at its opening. As enrollment grew rapidly, a separate school building was constructed in Irvington at 3601 Old Frederick Road.  On February 22, 1893, St. Joseph's Monastery School was dedicated by Cardinal Gibbons. In 1923, a new convent was completed to house the growing community of Sisters.  Enrollment continued to increase and on October 3, 1954, ground was broken for a new 12-classroom addition to the school, offering enrollment from first through eighth grades.  On September 18, 1955, the two-story brick addition to the school was blessed by Archbishop Keough. The school had steady enrollment until an increasing number of families began moving to the suburbs.

St. Bernardine's Catholic School, previously St. Joseph's Monastery School, opened in 1997 at 3601 Old Frederick Road, offering enrollment to kindergarten through grade 8.  It closed its doors on June 4, 2010. The school was one of 13 in the archdiocese selected for closing at the end of the 2009/2010 school year.

Nearby schools
Two public schools are located in adjoining neighborhoods.

 Beechfield Elementary School, at 301 South Beechfield Avenue in Yale Heights, serves children from pre-kindergarten through grade 6.
 Sarah M. Roach Elementary School, at 3434 Old Frederick Road in the neighborhood of St. Joseph, serves pre-kindergarten through grade 5. CLOSED

Significant landmarks

Irvington Theatre
Since it opened at 4113 Frederick Avenue in January 1925, the Irvington Theatre, with its marquee sign was a prominent landmark of the community. After remodeling in 1967, it was renamed the Irvington Cinema and began screening classic and foreign films.

The cinema's marquee became a somewhat less welcome presence, in a predominately Catholic neighborhood, when the cinema began screening adult films in 1969. It closed in May 1971 in response to local protests. In September 1971, the building was converted into a church. A marquee sign is no longer attached to the building.

St. Joseph's Monastery

St. Joseph's Passionist Monastery and St. Joseph's Monastery Parish, located at 3801 Old Frederick Road, constructed from blue granite blocks, are among the city's most beautiful historic structures. The Passionist Order was invited to Baltimore in 1865 by Archbishop Martin John Spalding. In 1868, the Passionists built a small wooden church on a tract of land along Frederick Avenue, opposite Loudon Park Cemetery. This building became known as the "Church of the Passion", marking the beginning of St. Joseph's Monastery Parish.

Construction of a new, larger church began in 1881 and was completed in 1883. Its cornerstone was placed by Cardinal James Gibbons. The original monastery, beside the church, burned down in 1883. A new monastery was completed in 1886.  The monastery chapel is extant and contains an 1887 Niemann pipe organ.

The congregation of St. Joseph's Monastery Parish outgrew their church building in the following century. In 1931, Archbishop Michael Joseph Curley placed the cornerstone for the parish's current church building. It was completed on October 2, 1932.

In April 2014, Father Thomas McCann, administrator of St. Joseph's, announced that the Passionist Priests would "no longer shepherd" St. Joseph's Monastery Church after 149 years of residence. The order's departure date was scheduled for June 30, 2014. The Very Rev. Robert Joerger, the provincial of the Passionists, reflected on the advanced age of many members of his religious order, as well as the declining numbers of that order, in the decision to leave Baltimore for other places. The Archdiocese of Baltimore assumed responsibility for St. Joseph's facilities on June 30, 2014.

References

External links 
 Southwest District Maps

 
Neighborhoods in Baltimore